Umberto Pittori (4 May 1913 – 13 October 1964) was an Italian boxer who competed in the 1936 Summer Olympics. In 1936 he was eliminated in the first round of the welterweight class after losing his fight to Imre Mándi.

He later was a professional boxer from 1938-1948., winning 19 of the 27 matches he was in.

References

External links
 
 Report on Italian Olympic boxers 

1913 births
1964 deaths
Sportspeople from Trieste
People from Austrian Littoral
Italian Austro-Hungarians
Welterweight boxers
Olympic boxers of Italy
Boxers at the 1936 Summer Olympics
Italian male boxers
20th-century Italian people